In enzymology, an adenosylmethionine cyclotransferase is an enzyme that catalyzes the chemical reaction

S-adenosyl-L-methionine  5'-methylthioadenosine + 2-aminobutan-4-olide

Hence, this enzyme has one substrate, S-adenosyl-L-methionine, and two products, 5'-methylthioadenosine and 2-aminobutan-4-olide.

This enzyme belongs to the family of transferases, specifically those transferring aryl or alkyl groups other than methyl groups.  The systematic name of this enzyme class is S-adenosyl-L-methionine alkyltransferase (cyclizing). This enzyme is also called adenosylmethioninase.

References 

 
 

EC 2.5.1
Enzymes of unknown structure